Myrtlewood is a town in Marengo County, Alabama, United States. At the 2020 census the population was 70, down from 130 in 2010.

History
A post office has been in operation at Myrtlewood since 1886. Myrtlewood was incorporated as a town in 1957. The town was named for a grove of crepe myrtle trees near the original town site.

Geography
Myrtlewood is located in western Marengo County at  (32.247254, -87.947141), along Alabama State Route 114.

Demographics

As of the census of 2000, there were 139 people, 59 households, and 45 families residing in the town. The racial makeup of the town was 79.14% White and 20.86% Black or African American. 0.72% of the population were Hispanic or Latino of any race.

There were 59 households, out of which 22.0% had children under the age of 18 living with them, 61.0% were married couples living together, 10.2% had a female householder with no husband present, and 23.7% were non-families. 23.7% of all households were made up of individuals, and 6.8% had someone living alone who was 65 years of age or older. The average household size was 2.36 and the average family size was 2.76.

In the town, the population was spread out, with 18.7% under the age of 18, 5.8% from 18 to 24, 25.9% from 25 to 44, 30.2% from 45 to 64, and 19.4% who were 65 years of age or older. The median age was 44 years. For every 100 females, there were 95.8 males. For every 100 females age 18 and over, there were 98.2 males.

The median income for a household in the town was $42,188, and the median income for a family was $50,114. Males had a median income of $51,667 versus $31,250 for females. The per capita income for the town was $21,262. There were 4.8% of families and 7.3% of the population living below the poverty line, including 7.1% of under eighteens and 13.0% of those over 64.

References

Towns in Marengo County, Alabama
Towns in Alabama